Ernest Thomas Roccio (1927-1952) was a speedway rider from the United States.

Speedway career 
Roccio was a leading speedway rider in the early 1950s. He reached the final of the Speedway World Championship in the 1951 Individual Speedway World Championship.

He rode in the top tier of British Speedway, riding for Wimbledon Dons. Previously he had raced for the Shelbourne Tigers in Dublin along with his brother John Roccio. While riding for Wimbledon on 22 July 1952 he was killed after crashing into the fence at high speed at West Ham Stadium, it has been reported that he died instantly but the newspaper report states he died in hospital.

World Final Appearances
 1951 -  London, Wembley Stadium - 15th - 2pts

See also
Rider deaths in motorcycle racing

References 

1927 births
1952 deaths
American speedway riders
Wimbledon Dons riders